Igor Maksimović (born 31 July 1999) is a Serbian footballer who plays as a midfielder for Novi Pazar.

Club career
On 8 February 2019, Maksimović was loaned out from FK Voždovac to FK Inđija for the rest of the season.

International career
Maksimović has played games for Serbia U16, Serbia U17, Serbia U18 and Serbia U19.

References

1999 births
Sportspeople from Jagodina
Living people
Serbian footballers
Serbia youth international footballers
Serbia under-21 international footballers
Association football midfielders
FK Voždovac players
FK Inđija players
FK Metalac Gornji Milanovac players
FK Novi Pazar players
Serbian SuperLiga players
Serbian First League players